The 2016–17 Botswana Premier League is the 52nd season of the Botswana Premier League since its establishment in 1966. Township Rollers clinched their second straight league title and 14th overall.

Team summaries

Promotion and relegation 
Teams promoted from Botswana First Division North and South
 Black Forest F.C.
 Mahalapye Hotspurs
 Security Systems

Teams relegated to Botswana First Division North and South
 BR Highlanders
 Motlakase Power Dynamos
 Satmos

Stadiums and locations

League table

Positions by round

References 

Botswana Premier League
Botswana